Bandbal may refer to:
 Bandbal-e Bala
 Bandbal-e Pain